Bryan George Kelly (born January 3, 1934) is an English composer, conductor, and pianist from Oxford. He was a choir boy at Worcester College and attended Southfield Grammar School. After lessons with Harold Spicer, the long-serving organist and choirmaster of Manchester College, Oxford, he studied at the Royal College of Music with Gordon Jacob and Herbert Howells, then with Nadia Boulanger in Paris. He subsequently taught at the Royal Scottish Academy of Music and (from 1963) at the Royal College of Music. He has spent periods of his teaching career in America, Italy, France and Egypt.

His compositions range from light orchestral music and works for brass band to more serious and extended orchestral works (such as his Symphony and the Concertante Dances) as well as church music,. His Magnificat and Nunc dimittis in C incorporate Latin American rhythms. Lighter orchestral works include the Cuban Suite, the New Orleans Suite, Divertissement, and two Leicestershire Schools Symphony Orchestra commissions – the overture Sancho Panza (1969) and the Sinfonia Concertante (1967). His works for brass band include Brass Bagatelles, the overture Provence and the Divertimento for Brass. In 1961, Kelly wrote the piano piece Tango especially for Peter Katin.

Instrumental solos and educational music are also important to him: for example, the engagingly presented Whodunnit Suite for trumpet and piano, which includes pieces of the titles: 'Poirot (Detective)', 'Lavinia Lurex (Actress)', 'Colonel Glib (Retired)', 'Miss Slight (Spinster of This Parish)', 'The Chief Suspect' and 'The Chase'.

Two CDs of Kelly's orchestral music have been issued by Heritage.
 Volume One (2014): Left Bank Suite, 'Epitaph for Peace' (from the two movement Lest We Forget), A Christmas Celebration (five movements), Concertante Dances, Globe Theatre Suite (for recorder and strings), and Nativity Scenes. Heritage HTG CD284 (2014).
 Volume Two (2021): Fantasy Overture: San Francisco; Calypso’s Isle; Concerto da camera; Four Realms Suite, Capricorn, A Christmas Dance (Sir Roger de Coverley), Concerto for Two Trumpets, Comedy Film for orchestra. Heritage HTG CD180 (2020).

The choir of Clare College, Cambridge issued a CD of the choral music in 2001, including the cantata Crucifixion, the Missa Brevis and the popular carol This Lovely Lady. There is a non-commercial recording of Kelly's Symphony No 1 (1983), by the City of Oxford Orchestra, director Yannis Daras, available on YouTube.

References

External links
 Bryan Kelly biography, Stainer & Bell
 Performance of the Magnificat in C, Guildford Cathedral Choir, Barry Rose
 Bryan Kelly and the LSSO Information and short audio extracts from the Cuban Suite

1934 births
Living people
British composers
Alumni of the Royal Conservatoire of Scotland
Alumni of the Royal College of Music
People educated at Southfield Grammar School

ja:ブライアン・ケリー